Toyota Motor Thailand Co., Ltd. (TMT) is the wholly owned subsidiary of Toyota Motor Corporation in Thailand, established in 1962. In 1979, Toyota began making pressed body parts in Thailand. In 1989, TMT began manufacturing engines locally. TMT controls the manufacturing of Toyota cars in Thailand and they supply cars to various official dealers throughout Thailand. TMT's main export market is the ASEAN region and the Oceania, but TMT also export cars to different parts of the world, especially the Toyota Hilux Vigo model. , there were 150 official Toyota dealers with 455 showrooms approved by TMT.

Operations
, TMT employed 16,477 at its Thai factories. Toyota Motor Thailand runs three plants in two provinces. The plant in Samrong, Samut Prakan Province produces pickup trucks and commercial vehicles. The two plants in Chachoengsao Province—at Ban Pho and Gateway—make passenger cars. The three plants have a combined maximum annual capacity of 760,000 units.

In 1988, Toyota Motor Thailand formed a joint venture with Toyota Auto Body called Toyota (formerly Thai) Auto Works. The venture is focused on producing the HiAce. Toyota Auto Body owns a 63% stake. The venture  has another plant in Samut Prakan, the Teparak plant.

Sales
Toyota posted its highest-ever Thai sales in 2012 at 516,086 vehicles, a 78 percent rise from 2011. Sales decreased by 13.7 percent to 445,464 in 2013 and shrank by 26.6 percent to 327,027 in 2014. In 2015, TMT reported sales of 266,005 vehicles, down 18.7 percent. Sales for the first five months of 2016 totalled 87,715 vehicles, down 13.4 percent from the same period in 2015. The company projected its 2016 whole-year sales to fall by 9.8 percent from 2015 to 240,000 vehicles, the fourth successive year of declining sales.

Thailand saw 1,007,552 new vehicles registered in 2019, a year-on-year decline of 3.3 percent. Toyota increased its Thai market share in 2019 to 33 percent, a 2.8 percent increase.

Management
 Chairman: Mr Ninnart Chaithirapinyo
 President: Mr Noriaki Yamashita

Models

Manufactured locally
The following is a list of plants and their products.

Chachoengsao (Gateway) Plant 
 Toyota Yaris Ativ (2017–present, export market version as Toyota Vios)
 Toyota Yaris (2006–present)
 Toyota Corolla Altis (2001–present)
 Toyota Corolla Cross (2020–present)
 Toyota C-HR (2018–present)
 Toyota Camry (1999–present)

Samrong Plant 
 Toyota Hilux (1975–present)
 Toyota Fortuner (2005–present)

Theparak Plant (Toyota Auto Works venture)
 Toyota Commuter (2000–present)
 Toyota HiAce (1992–present)

Ban Pho Plant
 Toyota Hilux (2007–present)

Imported 
 Toyota Innova (2005–present)
 Toyota Alphard (2007–present)
 Toyota Coaster (2011–present)
 Toyota Sienta (2016–present)
 Toyota GR Supra (2019–present)
 Toyota GR Yaris (2021)
 Toyota Veloz (2022–present)
 Toyota GR86 (2022–present)
 Toyota GR Corolla (2022)
 Toyota bZ4X (2022)

Former models

Manufactured locally 
 Toyota Corolla (1972–2001)
 Toyopet Tiara/Toyota Corona (1964–1999)
 Toyota Crown (1970–1995)
 Toyota Hilux Sport Rider (1998–2004)
 Toyota Prius (2010–2015)
 Toyota Soluna (1996–2003)
 Toyota Stout (1964–1975)
 Toyota Wish (2003–2009)
 Toyota Ventury (2005–2019)
 Daihatsu Charade (2011–2013, export only)
 Toyota Vios (Domestic market, 2002–2022)

Imported 

 Toyota Avanza
 Toyota Crown
 Toyota Land Cruiser
 Toyota Prius
 Toyota Previa
 Toyota RAV4
 Toyota Majesty (2019–2021)

References

External links
Toyota Motor Thailand Co., Ltd.

Toyota
Car manufacturers of Thailand
Vehicle manufacturing companies established in 1962